

The Morane-Saulnier MS.147 and its derivatives, the MS.148 and MS.149 were a family of trainer aircraft produced in France in the late 1920s for civil and military use. They were derived from other machines in Morane-Saulnier's successful line of monoplane trainers, combining the wire-braced parasol wing of the MS.138 with the fuselage and undercarriage of the MS.130.

The various subtypes saw service with the Aéronavale, Aéropostale, and a number of foreign air arms. They were largely withdrawn from French military service by 1935.

Variants
MS.147 production version with Salmson 9Ac engine (106 built)
MS.147P mailplane version for Aéropostale (3 built)
MS.148 version with Salmson 7Ac engine (1 built)
MS.149 version with Lorraine 5Pa engine for Aéronavale (56 built)

Operators

 Aéronavale (56 × MS.149)
 Aéropostale (3 × MS.147P)

 (30 × MS.147)

 Hellenic Air Force (5 × MS.147)

 Guatemalan Air Force

Turkish Air Force

 Venezuelan Air Force (MS.147)

Specifications (MS.147)

See also

References

Further reading

1920s French civil trainer aircraft
MS.147
Parasol-wing aircraft
Single-engined tractor aircraft
Aircraft first flown in 1928